Melanoblossiidae is a family of solifuges, first described by Carl Friedrich Roewer in 1933.

Genera 
, the World Solifugae Catalog accepts the following six genera:

 Daesiella Hewitt, 1934
 Dinorhax Simon, 1879
 Lawrencega Roewer, 1933
 Melanoblossia Purcell, 1903
 Microblossia Roewer, 1941
 Unguiblossia Roewer, 1941

References 

Solifugae
Arachnid families
Taxa described in 1933